was a Japanese sport shooter who competed in the 1984 Summer Olympics, in the 1988 Summer Olympics, and in the 1992 Summer Olympics. He was born in Kanagawa

References

1947 births
1996 deaths
Japanese male sport shooters
Trap and double trap shooters
Olympic shooters of Japan
Shooters at the 1984 Summer Olympics
Shooters at the 1988 Summer Olympics
Shooters at the 1992 Summer Olympics
Olympic silver medalists for Japan
Olympic medalists in shooting
Asian Games medalists in shooting
Shooters at the 1974 Asian Games
Shooters at the 1978 Asian Games
Shooters at the 1982 Asian Games
Shooters at the 1990 Asian Games
Medalists at the 1992 Summer Olympics
Asian Games gold medalists for Japan
Asian Games silver medalists for Japan
Asian Games bronze medalists for Japan
Medalists at the 1974 Asian Games
Medalists at the 1978 Asian Games
Medalists at the 1982 Asian Games
Medalists at the 1990 Asian Games
20th-century Japanese people